Junodia maculata is a species of praying mantis found in Zambia and Zimbabwe.

See also
List of mantis genera and species

References

Junodia
Insects of Zambia
Insects of Zimbabwe
Mantodea of Africa
Insects described in 1972